Megacraspedus litovalvellus is a moth of the family Gelechiidae. It is found in Russia (the southern Ural). The habitat consists of chalk steppes.

The wingspan is 14–16 mm for males and about 10 mm for females. The ground colour of the forewings is whitish ochreous, with densely scattered brown-tipped scales. The hindwings are pale fuscous. Adults are on wing from May to early August.

Etymology
The species is derived from Greek litos (meaning plain, simple, frugal) and refers to the plain valva in the male genitalia.

References

Moths described in 2010
Megacraspedus